Hemmerle is a Munich-based jeweller founded in 1893 by brothers Joseph and Anton Hemmerle.

Background
Anton and Joseph Hemmerle established Hemmerle by taking over an established goldsmiths’ company specialising in medals and orders and in 1895  they are appointment 'Purveyor to the Court' by Luitpold, Prince Regent of Bavaria by Royal warrant of appointment to create medals for the Royal Bavarian Court, Bavarian Order of Merit. The Hemmerle boutique at 14 Maximilianstraße opened in 1904 and remains there today.

Today, Christian Hemmerle, Joseph's great-grandson, manages the company along with his wife Yasmin and parents Stefan and Sylveli. Christian and Yasmin Hemmerle, Stefan and Sylveli’s son and daughter-in-law joined Hemmerle in 2006.

Stefan Hemmerle in 1995 designed a ring for the wife of a Munich art collector, in response to her practice of wearing Berlin iron jewellery (which Germans received in exchange for donating their gold and silver jewels toward funding the War of Liberation). He set a diamond in textured iron rather than in gold or platinum. The combination of common metal with a precious stone was unusual.

Hemmerle, is the exclusive maker of the Bavarian Order of Merit since it was instituted in 1957  as well as exclusively responsible for the making of the Bavarian Maximilian Order for Science and Art since 1905.

Design
Hemmerle jewellers use gemstones including orange-pink sapphires, green diamonds or conch pearls. often set in unorthodox materials such as copper, steel or wood. Each piece is designed as a unique creation. The family use materials including South China Sea Melo pearls or blue aquamarines from Brazil's Santa Maria mines.

Hemmerle's styles include the tassel earring, created using a traditional Austrian technique of knitting together cut stones often in bright colours into invisibly stitched strands.

Hemmerle's Harmony bangle was included in the permanent collection of the William and Judith Bollinger Jewellery Gallery at London's Victoria and Albert Museum in October 2010.

In 2011, the Hemmerles co-wrote a book Delicious Jewels with the chef and author Tamasin Day-Lewis, published by Prestel Publishing.
	
Hemmerle's Harmony bangle, Egyptian Story, 2012, became part of the permanent collection of the Cooper Hewitt, Smithsonian Design Museum in New York City in January 2013.

In 2014 the company designed a jewellery collection titled Nature's Jewels consisting of twelve brooches, two pairs of earrings, a necklace and a ring, with themes of fruits, seeds, leaves and trees. The company also published a poetry book, Nature’s Jewels. through the art-book publisher Mack with poems by Greta Bellamacina.

In 2016 Hemmerle announced The [AL] Project, a series of jewels exploring the properties of aluminium, previewed at TEFAF in Maastricht. In the same year, Hemmerle participated in Beauty—Cooper Hewitt Design Triennial at the Cooper Hewitt, Smithsonian Design Museum in New York. This is the fifth instalment of the Triennial exhibition series.

In 2018 Hemmerle celebrated its 125th anniversary with two projects. The first was Hidden Treasures with creations inspired by its past as a medal-maker  and the second was the Revived Treasures project with a body of work that paid homage to Egyptian civilisation. The project included twenty four one-of-a-kind creations, sixteen of which incorporated ancient Egyptian artifacts that were treasure-hunted and collected over the past decade, one creation incorporated a 19th century artifact and seven creations were inspired by Egyptian motifs and culture.

In 2019 a Bishop’s Pectoral Cross created by Hemmerle in 1900  joined the permanent collection of The Metropolitan Museum of Art, New York. The cross was designed by Hemmerle’s founders - brothers Joseph and Anton Hemmerle - for the Exposition Universelle of 1900 in Paris, where it was awarded one of the show’s  prizes.

Museum exhibitions 
Hemmerle jewels have been part of numerous exhibitions worldwide including Canada, the United States, Japan, Australia, France and the UAE, amongst others. Exhibitions include: Myths: Jewels Today – Seen by Stefan Hemmerle, Die Neue Sammlung, the State Museum of Applied Arts and Design, Munich, Germany (2006); Pearls, travelling exhibition (2001-2008); The Nature of Diamonds, travelling exhibition (2008-2010); The Pearl Exhibition, Museum of Islamic Art, Doha, Qatar (2010); Serpentina: The Snake in Jewellery Around the World, Schmuckmuseum, Pforzheim, Germany, (2010-2011); Pearls, Victoria and Albert Museum, London, UK (2013-2014), and Beauty - Cooper Hewitt Design Triennial, Cooper Hewitt, Smithsonian Design Museum, New York USA (2016).

References

External links 
 

Manufacturing companies based in Munich
German companies established in 1893
Jewellery companies of Germany
Family-owned companies